Anna of Racibórz (b. 1292/98 – d. 1 January/21 August 1340), was a Polish princess member of the House of Piast in the Racibórz branch and by marriage Duchess of Opawa and Racibórz.

She was the second child but eldest daughter of Duke Przemysław of Racibórz by his wife Anna, daughter of Duke Konrad II of Masovia.

Life
In 1318 Anna married with Duke Nicholas II of Opava, illegitimate grandson of King Ottokar II of Bohemia. She bore her husband six children, one son and five daughters:
 Jan I, who later inherited the Duchy of Racibórz
 Euphemia, married Siemowit III of Masovia
Elizabeth, who became a nun,
 Agnes, also a nun
 Anna, by marriage Burgravine of Magdeburg
 Margaret of Opava, married John Henry of Moravia

In 1336, after the death of her only brother Leszek, Anna's husband was invested with the Duchy of Racibórz (he claimed the succession as the next male relative of the late Duke) after the arbitral decision of King John of Bohemia, despite the strong resistance of the next blood male relatives of Leszek.

Anna died four years later between January–August 1340 and was probably buried in the Dominican monastery of Racibórz.

References

1290s births
1340 deaths
Piast dynasty
Polish princesses
14th-century Polish people
14th-century Polish women
13th-century Polish people
13th-century Polish women